Porklips Now is a short, low budget parody film, made in 1980 by the American director Ernie Fosselius, based on the 1979 motion picture Apocalypse Now.

It chronicles the journey of Dullard (played by William "Billy" Gray, most famous as "Bud" in the Father Knows Best TV series), a gardener and handyman, sent to Chinatown by two butchers to meet a business rival, Fred "Madman" Mertz, and "take care of business". The film cleverly and humorously incorporates references to signature elements of the film on which it is based, albeit in a somewhat conspicuously low-budget manner.

Echoing a widely held if erroneous belief about Apocalypse Now, the film features several alternate endings.

The film was included on the compilation VHS release Hardware Wars, and Other Film Farces from Warner Home Video and is currently available on VHS and DVD from Pyramid Direct Films.

Complete credited cast
 Billy Gray – Dullard (credited as William Gray)
 Ernie Fosselius – Mertz/Kilroy
 John Brent – Head Butcher
 Leon Martell – Butcher's Aide
 Mark Lee – "Slick"
 Jim Turner – Rick
 Larry Walker – "Famous Italian Director"
 Tom Bullock – photographer

DVD release 
In 2009, Apprehensive Films released Porklips Now onto DVD.

References

External links
HardwareWarsDVD.com – Official Website For Hardware Wars & The Films of Ernie Fosselius including Porklips Now

1980s parody films
American parody films
1980 films
Fan films
Apocalypse Now
American comedy short films
1980 comedy films
1980s English-language films
1980s American films